Glenn Altschuler is an American writer and university-level educator and administrator. At Cornell University, he is the Thomas and Dorothy Litwin Professor of American Studies, and a Weiss Presidential Fellow.

Early life and education
Altschuler received his PhD in American history from Cornell in 1976.

Career
Altschuler began his teaching career as a history professor at Ithaca College.  Altschuler has been an administrator and teacher at Cornell since 1981. He is noted for his work on the history of American popular culture. He believes that popular culture is "contested terrain"—in which social and economic groups struggle to make their marks on society.

From 1991 to 2020, he served as Dean of the Cornell University School of Continuing Education and Summer Sessions. His year-long course in American Popular Culture was among the most popular in the university.

For four years, Altschuler wrote a column on higher education for the Education Life section of The New York Times. From 2002 to 2005, he was a regular panelist on national and international affairs for the WCNY television program The Ivory Tower Half-Hour.

Altschuler was also Cornell's vice president for University Relations for four years.

He has written over 1,300 scholarly essays for works and publishers including American Heritage, The Australian, The Boston Globe, The Baltimore Sun, Los Angeles Times, The Chronicle of Higher Education, Barron's, The Florida Courier, Inside Higher Ed, The Jerusalem Post, The Kansas City Star, the Minneapolis Star Tribune, The Moscow Times, the New York Observer, the Philadelphia Inquirer, the Pittsburgh Post-Gazette, The Oregonian (Portland), San Francisco Chronicle, Tulsa World, NPR's Books We Like, CNN, Forbes, The Huffington Post, Psychology Today, The Conversation US, and The Hill.

Prizes and awards
The Clark Teaching Award
The Donna and Robert Paul Award for Excellence in Faculty Advising
The Kendall S. Carpenter Memorial Award for Outstanding Advising
The Stephen H. Weiss Presidential Fellowship (2006)

Books
Ten Great American Trials:  Lessons in Advocacy (co-authored with Faust F. Rossi, American Bar Association 2016)
Cornell:  A History, 1940–2015 (co-authored with Isaac Kramnick, Cornell University Press 2014)
The GI Bill:  A New Deal for Veterans (co-authored with Stuart M. Blumin, Oxford University Press 2009)
The 100 Most Notable Cornellians (co-authored with Isaac Kramnick and R. Laurence Moore, Cornell University Press 2003)
 All Shook Up: How Rock 'n Roll Changed America (Oxford University Press 2003)
Rude Republic: Americans and Their Politics in the 19th Century (co-authored with Stuart M. Blumin, Princeton University Press 2000)
Changing Channels: America in TV Guide (co-authored with David I. Grossvogel, University of Illinois Press 1992)
Better Than Second Best: Love and Work in the Life of Helen Magill (University of Illinois Press 1990)
Revivalism, Social Conscience and Community in the Burned-Over District (co-authored with Jan M. Saltzgaber, Cornell University Press 1983)
Race, Ethnicity, and Class in American Social Thought, 1865–1919 (American History Series, John Hope Franklin and A. S. Eisenstadt, eds., Harlan Davidson, Inc. 1982)
Andrew D. White: Educator, Historian, Diplomat (Cornell University Press 1979)

References

External links
Official website

Year of birth missing (living people)
Living people
Cornell University alumni
Cornell University faculty
Historians of the United States
21st-century American historians
21st-century American male writers
American male non-fiction writers